North Texas Mean Green (formerly North Texas Eagles) represents the University of North Texas (UNT) in intercollegiate athletics. The teams compete in Division I of the National Collegiate Athletic Association (NCAA). North Texas competed in the Sun Belt Conference until joining Conference USA (C-USA) on July 1, 2013. UNT's official school colors are Green and White. North Texas' mascot is an Eagle named Scrappy.

Nickname 
The name "Mean Green" was adopted by fans and media in 1966 for a North Texas football defensive squad that finished the season second in the nation against the rush.  That school year, Joe Greene, then a sophomore at North Texas, played left defensive tackle on the football team and competed in track and field (shot put). There are conflicting accounts for the origin of the nickname. Two possible origins are two separate cheers that supposedly developed during North Texas' 1966 game against UTEP. One cheer was by Sidney Sue Graham, wife of the North Texas sports information director. In response to a tackle by Greene, she blurted out, "That’s the way, Mean Greene!" However, Bill Mercer, former North Texas play-by-play announcer, states Graham's thought behind the nickname was the Mean Green defense. Her husband began including the nickname for the team in press releases and it caught on with the media. Meanwhile, in the student section, North Texas basketball players Willie Davis and Ira Daniels, unsatisfied with the unenthusiastic crowd, began to chant "Mean Green, you look so good to me." The rest of the crowd soon followed. "After that we did it every game," Davis says. "A lot of people later on started associating it with Joe because his last name was Greene, but it actually started with that simple chant that Saturday night at Fouts Field. And that's the truth." By 1968, "Mean Green" was on the back of shirts, buttons, bumper stickers, and the cover of the North Texas football brochure. Even the band became identified as the "Mean Green Marching Machine."

Sports sponsored 

A member of Conference USA, North Texas sponsors teams in six men's and ten women's NCAA sanctioned sports.

Baseball 
In 1984, the university fielded a varsity baseball team until it was discontinued after the 1988 season because of the newly enacted Title IX requiring an equal number of female players to male players. The team competed as a member of the Southland Conference. After starting the program's inaugural season with a 0–19 record, the Eagles won their first game against the Emporia State Hornets, 4–1. The team played their home games at Mack Park in Denton.

The university had planned to revive the program and build an on-campus ballpark. The ballpark would have been home field of both the Mean Green, and Denton Outlaws. The program's revival failed to happen and the Denton Outlaws disbanded after the 2007 season.

The 2014 UNT fiscal budget included $600,000 in start up costs for reviving the Mean Green baseball program. The university plans to construct a new on campus ballpark within the Mean Green Village. Decade long accounting errors by the UNT System have led to the baseball program to be placed on hold indefinitely. The earliest the program could have been revived was in time for the 2016 season, dependent on the facilities' construction beginning in early 2015, but that has yet to happen.

Season-by-season results 

Source:

Football 

Founded in 1913, the Mean Green has won eight Lone Star Conference championships, five Gulf Coast Conference championships, five Missouri Valley Conference championships, two Southland Conference championships and most recently, four consecutive Sun Belt Conference championships. The team has also appeared in eight bowl games, winning three, most recently the 2014 Heart of Dallas Bowl. From 1952 until the 2010 season, home football games were played at Fouts Field. A new 30,850-seat stadium, Apogee Stadium opened for the 2011 season.

Basketball 

Since 1973, the school's teams for men's and women's basketball have played their home games in the Super Pit.  For most of its history, the Mean Green have had patches of success, starting in the 1970s when the team received its first ever top-20 ranking under head coach https://en.wikipedia.org/wiki/Bill_Blakeley Bill Blakeley.  Blakeley coached three consecutive 20-win seasons: 1975–76 (22–4); 1976–77 (21–6); 1977–78 (22–6)  From 2001 to 2012, the men's team experienced relative success under head coach Johnny Jones. During the 2006–2007 season, North Texas won its first Sun Belt Conference title and advanced to the NCAA Tournament for the first time since 1988. North Texas won the Sun Belt Conference title again during the 2009–2010 season to advance to the NCAA Tournament for the second time in four years. Jones left the team for his alma mater LSU in 2012, and his replacement Tony Benford has struggled to maintain Jones' success in Denton. In 2013, North Texas joined Conference USA.

Men's golf

The men's golf team has won four NCAA Championships in 1949, 1950, 1951, and 1952.

School spirit 
The school's colors are Green and White. The music for the alma mater, "Glory to the Green and White", (originally titled "Our College") was composed by Julia Smith in 1919 and adopted by the school in 1922. The lyrics were written by Charles Langford, then a third-year letterman on the football team.  The school's fight song, Fight, North Texas, composed by Francis Stroup, was adopted in 1939.  The school mascot is an eagle named Scrappy. The 400-member Green Brigade Marching Band performs at every home game, both pregame and halftime, for the crowd.

Facilities 
Many of the school's athletic facilities are located at the Mean Green Village, which opened for the 2006–07 athletic season.  The athletic village area includes:

 Apogee Stadium (Football)
 UNT Coliseum (Men's, women's basketball
 Mean Green Soccer and Track & Field Stadium (Women's Soccer, Track & Field)
 Waranch Tennis Complex (Women's Tennis)
 Lovelace Stadium (Softball)
 North Texas Volleyball Center (Volleyball)

Alumni
Golf
The era of collegiate prominence in Texas golf began with North Texas winning four consecutive NCAA Division I Championships from 1949 to 1952.  Intercollegiate golf had until then been dominated by the Ivy League, which—since 1897 when intercollegiate golf began—had won 36 national titles.  

North Texas students Don January, who later won the PGA Championship, the 1951 U.S. Amateur champion Billy Maxwell, and Joe Conrad who was the winner of the 1955 British Amateur Championship,  the 1953 Trans-Mississippi Amateur winner, was the 1953 and 1954 Southern Amateur winner, was the 1951 Texas Amateur winner, was the 1950 Mexican Amateur winner, was a member of the 1955 Walker Cup U.S. team, was a member of the victorious Americas Cup (golf) team in 1954 and 1956, and is a member of the Texas Golf Hall Of Fame, were all members of the North Texas golf team when they won the NCAA Division I Men's Golf Championships.  Fred Cobb (1899–1954), the coach, launched the team in 1945.   years since winning its fourth consecutive Championship, only one other team in the nation—the Houston Cougars—has surpassed four consecutive titles.  In the -year history of intercollegiate golf, North Texas is one of only nine with more than one national title.

Football 
On September 1, 1956, Abner Haynes and his high school classmate Leon A. King (born 1938), became the first African American students to participate on the North Texas football team.  In the larger picture, Haynes and King were the first to break the color barrier for intercollegiate sports in Texas—seven years before anyone was authorized to break it at a Southwest Conference school. Haynes quickly became an offensive and defensive star on the team.  Despite his athletic leadership and fan popularity, Haynes experienced painful encounters with Jim Crow—including not being allowed to live on campus.  Perhaps the worst was when Ole Miss, Mississippi State, and Chattanooga discontinued scheduling North Texas after 1956, citing state laws.  Haynes went on to play with the Dallas Texans (1960–1963), earning the American Football League MVP in 1961, and continued playing when the team became the Kansas City Chiefs (1963–1964).  Then he played for the Denver Broncos (1965–1966), the Miami Dolphins (1967), and the New York Jets.  Haynes is in the Halls of Fame of North Texas (1986), Kansas City Chiefs (1991), and Texas Sports (2007).  Haynes, who now lives in Denton, is one of a few athletes who was able to play high school, college, and professional football in North Texas.

Mean Joe Greene, in 1968, was selected as a College Football Consensus All American, the only alumnus in the -year history of football at North Texas to win the honor. He went on to the Pittsburgh Steelers where he anchored the Steel Curtain defense that led Pittsburgh to four Super Bowl titles. In 1976, North Texas inducted Greene as a Distinguished Alumnus, an honor bestowed only to twenty-nine others during the then ten-year history of the award.  On August 1, 1983, Governor Mark White appointed Greene to the Board of Regents of North Texas, making him the first African American to serve as a regent of any Texas state university. In 1987, Greene was inducted into the Pro Football Hall of Fame, the only alumnus ever to become a member.  In 1988, he was named to the North Texas Hall of Fame.

Championship history

National titles 
NCAA Division I men's golf: 1949, 1950, 1951, 1952

Conference titles

Football
Lone Star Conference: 1932, 1935*, 1936, 1939, 1940, 1941, 1946, 1947
Gulf Coast Conference: 1950, 1951, 1952, 1955
Sun Belt Conference: 2001, 2002, 2003, 2004

Men's basketball
Southland tournament: 1988
Sun Belt tournament: 2007, 2010
Sun Belt West Division: 2009–10
College Basketball Invitational: 2018
C-USA: 2020
C-USA West Division: 2022
C-USA tournament: 2021

Women's soccer
Sun Belt: 2001, 2004, 2005, 2011, 2012
Sun Belt tournament: 2004, 2005, 2012
C-USA: 2014, 2015, 2016, 2017, 2018
C-USA tournament: 2015, 2018, 2019

Others
 Men's outdoor track and field (18)
 Texas Intercollegiate Athletic Association
 1923
 Lone Star Conference
 1932, 1933, 1935, 1936, 1937, 1938, 1940, 1941, 1943, 1946, 1949
 Missouri Valley Conference
 1967, 1970, 1973, 1974
 Sun Belt Conference
 2000, 2002

 Men's cross country (10)
 Lone Star Conference
 1932, 1934
 Southland Conference
 1986, 1987, 1988, 1990, 1991, 1994
 Sun Belt Conference
 2000
 C-USA
 2014, 2018

 Men's golf (30)
 Lone Star Conference
 1941, 1942, 1943, 1946, 1947, 1948, 1949
 Gulf Coast Conference
 1950, 1956
 Missouri Valley Conference
 1961, 1962, 1963, 1964, 1965, 1966, 1968, 1969, 1970, 1971, 1972, 1974, 1975
 Southland Conference
 1984, 1993, 1996
 Big West Conference
 1999
 Sun Belt Conference
 2003, 2012, 2013
 Conference USA
 2015

 Women's indoor track and field (1)
 Sun Belt Conference
 2005
 Women's outdoor track and field (3)
 Sun Belt Conference
 2003, 2012, 2013

 Women's cross country (1)
 Southland Conference
 1989

 Women's tennis (4)
 Southland Conference
 1990
 Sun Belt Conference
 2010, 2012, 2013

 Women's golf (1)
 Conference USA
 2021

 Volleyball (1)
 Southland Conference
 1995

 Sun Belt Conference (West Division)
 2010*, 2012

 Conference USA 
 2017

 Softball (2)
 Conference USA 
 2019*, 2021

Football postseason 
Optimist Bowl: 1946
Salad Bowl: 1948 
Sun Bowl: 1959
New Orleans Bowl: 2001,2002,2003,2004,2017
Heart of Dallas Bowl: 2014, 2016
New Mexico Bowl: 2018
Myrtle Beach Bowl: 2020
Frisco Football Classic: 2021

References

External links